Ha-Karmel was a Hebrew periodical, edited and published by Samuel Joseph Fuenn in Vilna from 1860 to 1880. It was one of the important forces of the Haskalah movement in the Russian Empire.

History
Ha-Karmel was founded by Samuel Joseph Fuenn in 1860 as a weekly, and was continued as such (with some interruptions) until 1871. Eight volumes appeared in these eleven years, of which volumes 1–3 have supplements in Russian. It then became a monthly, of which four volumes appeared from 1871 to 1880, when the publication was suspended.  was associated with Fuenn in the editorship.  later assisted Fuenn in the same capacity.

Ha-Karmel was more of a literary periodical and less of a newspaper than other Hebrew contemporaries like Ha-Maggid or Ha-Melitz, in part because the license granted by the Tsarist regime prohibited Fuenn from publishing articles on politics. The periodical contained poetry, translations, historical material, literary criticism, Torah scholarship, and book reviews.

Notable contributors

 Reuben Asher Braudes
 Judah Leib Gordon
 Avrom Ber Gotlober
 Isaac Kaminer

References

External links
 Ha-Karmel at the National Library of Israel

Haskalah
Hebrew-language newspapers
Magazines published in the Russian Empire
Monthly magazines
Publications disestablished in 1880
Publications established in 1860
Weekly magazines
Newspapers published in Vilnius